Oenoe or Oenoë or Oinoe, also known as Boeonoa, was a town of ancient Elis. It was located near Ephyra.

References

Populated places in ancient Elis
Former populated places in Greece
Lost ancient cities and towns